An RC flight simulator is a computer program that allows pilots of radio-controlled aircraft to practice on a computer, without the risk and expense of damaging a real model. Besides the obvious use of training beginners, they are also used for practising new aerobatics, evaluating a model before buying it, and to allow flight practice when conditions are otherwise unsuitable.  Most simulators allow the use of real R/C transmitters to control the sim.

There are a number of commercial packages available, such as Eiperle CGM's neXt - RC Flight Simulator, SVK Systems' ClearView, Knife Edge Software's RealFlight, IPACS' AeroFly and Trasna Technology's AccuRC. There are also a number of free simulators, with FS One being the most well known and most feature rich.

Most simulators allow the importing of add-ons such as new models and landscapes. There are many web sites dedicated to offering free content like this.

Some of these simulators are dedicated to R/C flight, while others are generic simulators that can simulate both full-scale and R/C flight.

Feature Comparison

References

External links 
 Forum - RC-Sim.de , the RC-Simulation Server

Radio-controlled aircraft